is a significant case from the Supreme Court of Canada in the area of Canadian administrative law, focusing on whether the standard of review framework set out in Dunsmuir v. New Brunswick applies to decisions of the Governor in Council of Canada (i.e., the Cabinet of Canada), and whether it has authority to vary or rescind an administrative tribunal decision on questions of law or jurisdiction.

Background

Appeals to the Governor in Council
Under various statutes passed by the Parliament of Canada since 1888, the Governor in Council has been authorized to vary or rescind decisions taken by certain administrative tribunals of the Government of Canada. Current authority to do so is conferred under the following Acts:

Similar authority has been granted by provincial statutes to the Lieutenant-Governor in Council (i.e., the provincial cabinet). Such power has been described as "legislative in nature and ... no hearing is required in such cases."

The procedure is seen to be a significant barrier to participation in regulatory decision-making. Although there have been calls to abolish such routes of appeal as they constitute policy appeals subject to lobbying efforts, subsequent federal Acts have retained them.

The case at hand

At the beginning of 2008, Peace River Coal Inc. (a subsidiary of Anglo American plc) entered into a 30-month contract with CN to ship coal from its facilities at Trend, British Columbia Within the contract, it was stated that "CN fuel surcharge tariff 7402 will apply for the duration of this contract."

In February 2008, CN introduced a reduced fuel surcharge through tariff 7403 effective that April, but advised present contractholders that "Contractual agreements currently subject to fuel surcharge 7402 will remain in effect until those agreements expire, at which time we expect 7403 to be applied."

Peace River Coal applied to the Canadian Transportation Agency for an order establishing a reasonable surcharge with respect to its shipments by substitution of the newer tariff. The Agency declined, stating that the contract fell within an exemption for "rates for the movement of traffic." While PRC did not appeal, the Canadian Industrial Transportation Association (of which PRC was a member) petitioned the Governor in Council to rescind the CTA decision.

In June 2010, an order in council was issued rescinding the decision. In so doing, the order declared:

CN applied to the Federal Court for an order in the nature of certiorari, quashing the order in council and restoring the CTA decision.

The courts below

Federal Court
The order was granted. In his decision, Hughes J declared:

as a matter of law, "the fuel surcharge as expressed in Tariff 7402 was part of the 'rate' charged to the shipper as contemplated by that Act,"
PRC sought to vary its contract with CN in order to incorporate the reduced fuel surcharge,
the Agency found that it lacked jurisdiction since it was being asked to consider and amend a contract,
CITA's petition to the Governor in Council asked it to ignore PRC's request that the Agency vary the contract and to simply ask the Agency to review the Tariff for "reasonableness" without regard to it,
the Order-in-Council expressly did not direct that the Agency require that PRC and CN amend their contract to reflect the amended Tariff,
s. 41 of the Act (which provides for appeals to the Federal Court of Appeal) does not remove from the Governor-in-Council the power to vary or rescind a decision of the Agency, even in respect of questions of law or jurisdiction,
the Governor-in-Council, in deciding matters of pure jurisdiction such as the issue here, must be subject to the Dunsmuir correctness standard on review, as there was no issue of public policy involved, and
the Agency was correct in dismissing the Application for lack of jurisdiction, and the Governor-in-Council was not correct in rescinding that decision.

Federal Court of Appeal
On appeal, the order was set aside. In a unanimous ruling, Dawson JA stated:

The Federal Court was correct in characterizing that the Governor in Council's decision did not decide the legal question of whether the existence of the confidential contract precluded Peace River from benefiting from any finding that CN Tariff 7402 was unreasonable.
Following the FCA's current jurisprudence, the Dunsmuir reasonableness standard of review applies to decisions made by the Governor in Council with respect to questions of mixed fact, policy and law.
The decision was reasonable, as it falls within the range of outcomes that are defensible in respect of the facts and law.
No decision is taken as to the Federal Court's finding that the fuel surcharge formed part of CN's transportation rate, as the issue is still live at the Agency.

At the Supreme Court
The appeal was dismissed, with costs to the Attorney General of Canada and one set of costs to PRC and CITA. In a unanimous decision, Rothstein J declared:

 Policy considerations may be at the root of the Governor in Council's interest in the statutory interpretation issue, but that does not transform the nature of the question to one of policy or fact. The question of whether a party to a confidential contract can bring a complaint under s. 120.1 of the CTA is one of law.
 Under current jurisprudence, the only inherent limitation is that the Governor in Council is not empowered to address issues arising under the CTA ab initio: "Cabinet's authority is restricted to matters already dealt with by the Commission, and such matters must be orders, decisions, rules or regulations ..."
 Petitions to the Governor in Council are not restricted to issues of fact or policy. The Governor in Council has the authority to answer legal questions, which is properly supervised by the courts in the course of judicial review.
 The precedents instruct that the Dunsmuir framework applies to administrative decision-makers generally and not just to administrative tribunals, and is thus applicable to adjudicative decisions of the Governor in Council.
 In this case, the Governor in Council was interpreting the CTA. As the question of statutory interpretation involved the issue of whether the s. 120.1 complaint mechanism was available to certain parties, it did not fall within any of the categories of questions to which a correctness review applies. As such, the applicable standard of review is reasonableness.
 As the Governor in Council's decision was supported by the facts and the wording of s. 120.1(1), and it is consistent with Parliament's intention, it was held to be reasonable.
 The Federal Court of Appeal's observation that the issue of fuel surcharges constituted part of transportation rates was still a live one before the Agency was held to be correct.

Impact
CN has been welcomed as a clarification of the extent to which the Dunsmuir framework applies to all administrative decision-makers, thus building on its decision in Catalyst Paper, and distinguishing it from Katz Group, which focused on the vires of regulation. It is an open question as to whether the "legislative capacity" review test originating in Inuit Taparisat may be overruled or confined to its own special facts as a result.

Further reading

Notes

References

2014 in Canadian case law
Canadian administrative case law
Canadian constitutional case law
Canadian judicial review case law
Supreme Court of Canada cases
Canadian National Railway